Jus may refer to:

Law
 Jus (law), the Latin word for law or right
 Jus (canon law), a rule within the Roman Catholic Church

People 
 Juš Kozak (1892–1964), Slovenian writer
 Juš Milčinski, Slovenian theatre improviser
 Justin Jus Oborn (born 1971), British lead guitarist and songwriter of the band Electric Wizard

Other uses
 Jus Reservoir, in Malacca, Malaysia
 Japan-US (cable system), a submarine telecommunications cable
 Jupiter Upper Stage, a proposed American rocket stage
 Yus or jus, a group of letters in the early Cyrillic alphabet
 abbreviation for jussive mood, a grammatical mood
 JUS, IATA code for USA Jet Airlines, an American cargo airline
 jus, ISO 639-3 code for the Jumla Sign Language

See also
 Au jus ('with juice'), a culinary term referring to sauce served with meat
 IUS (disambiguation)
 Juss (disambiguation)
Juice